Takoradi Technical Institute is a mixed-sex school found in Takoradi.The school was established in 1982 with the collaboration of the Ghanaian Government and German Government Support for Technical Cooperation.
The school is popular for its facilities which are used to train and enhance the technical skills of the students.

History
Takoradi Technical Institute (T.T.I) was established in 1982 and started with 32 students. The students in the past wore blue shirts and khaki shorts.

Departments
Welding and Fabrication Technology 
Electrical Engineering Technology 
Hospitality and Catering Management 
Automotive Engineering Technology 
Building And Construction Technology 
Fashion Design Technology 
Refrigeration and Air-conditioning Technology 
Plumbing And Gas Fitting Technology 
Mechanical engineering
Computer Technology 
Information Technology 
Degital Design Technology 
Business Administration
Electronics Engineering

Houses
There are six houses to which every student belongs to, these houses are:

 Tewiah House
 Yankey House
 Boafo House
 Sekyi Ahyia House
 Brempong Yaw House
 German House

References

Educational institutions established in 1982
High schools in Ghana
Technical schools
1982 establishments in Ghana